Hanakee is the name of a small rocky islet lying off the southern coast of Hiva Oa, separating Atuona Bay from Taa Oa.

The island's only vegetation is some small shrubs and grasses.

See also
Marquesas Islands
French Polynesia

Islands of the Marquesas Islands